Dr Sukhjiwan Kaur is an Indian–Australian molecular geneticist. She is Senior Research Scientist with the Department of Environment and Primary Industries, Victoria.

Early life and education 
Kaur was born in Jagraon, a small town of Northern India in 1978. She attended Guru Nanak Public School in Jagraon. She received her BSc from the Panjab University in 1997, and an MSc in Biochemistry from Punjab Agricultural University (PAU), India in 2000. She then received an International Postgraduate Research Scholarship to pursue a PhD at the University of Melbourne. She completed her PhD in Plant Molecular Genetics in 2006.

Career 
Kaur was awarded the Young Scientist Award from PAU in 2000 for an outstanding research in plant biochemistry during her Masters. She then joined the Government College for Women, Ludhiana, India, as a lecturer in Plant Biochemistry where she spent 2 years before moving to Melbourne in 2002 to start her PhD. During her PhD, she worked on abiotic stress tolerances in rapeseed.

In 2006, Kaur joined the Department of Environment and Primary Industries (DEPI) as a molecular geneticist. Currently, Kaur leads the molecular marker project in pulses in collaboration with pulse breeding programs, aiming to deliver better pulse varieties to Australian growers. She is also involved in the International lentil genome sequencing consortium, representing DEPI as Australian partner.

References 

Australian women scientists
Living people
1978 births
Australian geneticists
Punjab Agricultural University people
University of Melbourne alumni
Indian emigrants to Australia
Australian people of Indian Punjabi descent
University of Melbourne women